Fabio Ceccarelli (born 7 February 1983) is an Italian footballer who plays for Lega Pro Seconda Divisione club Aprilia.

Biography
Born in Rome, Lazio, Ceccarelli started his senior career at Serie D teams before signed by Serie C2 club Gela Calcio. In June 2007 he was signed by Serie B team Treviso on free transfer. However, he was loaned to Lega Pro teams Rovigo, Martina and Monopoli before Treviso bankrupted in 2009. He was signed by Serie A club Chievo on free transfer but immediately farmed to Cosenza in co-ownership deal on 6 July, for a peppercorn fee of €1,000. "Team-mate" Daniele Piro also joined the same club in the same window. On 1 February 2010 he left for Foggia, and Piro also left the club.

On 25 June 2010 Cosenza acquired him outright for free. On 25 August 2010 he was loaned to Seconda Divisione club Brindisi.

In summer 2011 he was signed by Aprilia on free transfer.

References

External links
 
 Football.it Profile 
 

Italian footballers
S.S.D. Città di Gela players
Rovigo Calcio players
A.S.D. Martina Calcio 1947 players
Cosenza Calcio players
Calcio Foggia 1920 players
S.S.D. Città di Brindisi players
Association football forwards
Footballers from Rome
1983 births
Living people
Pol. Monterotondo Lupa players